Kelan County is a county in Xinzhou Prefecture, in the northwest of Shanxi Province, China. The Taiyuan Satellite Launch Center is located in this county.

Area: .

Population: 80,000

Postal Code: 036300

Telephone Area Code: 0350

The county government is located in Lanyi town.

Climate

Transportation 
Xinbao Expressway
Railway between Kelan and Taiyuan
China National Highway 209

References

External links
 Official website of Tongzi Government

County-level divisions of Shanxi
Xinzhou